The 1956 Kansas Jayhawks football team represented the University of Kansas in the Big Seven Conference during the 1956 NCAA University Division football season. In their third season under head coach Chuck Mather, the Jayhawks compiled a 3–6–1 record (2–4 against conference opponents), finished tied for fifth in the Big Seven Conference, and were outscored by all opponents by a combined total of 215 to 163. They played their home games at Memorial Stadium in Lawrence, Kansas.

The team's statistical leaders included Homer Floyd with 638 rushing yards, Charlie McCue with 48 points scored, and Wally Strauch with 596 passing yards. Galen Wahlmeier was the team captain.

Schedule

References

Kansas
Kansas Jayhawks football seasons
Kansas Jayhawks football